Hackworth is a surname. Notable people with the surname include:

Ben Hackworth (born 1977), Australian writer and film director
David Hackworth (1930–2005), United States Army colonel and prominent military journalist
Green Hackworth (1883–1973), American jurist of international law
John Hackworth (born 1970), American soccer coach
John Wesley Hackworth (19th century), inventor of Hackworth valve gear
Thomas Hackworth (died 1877), engineer and brother of Timothy Hackworth
Timothy Hackworth (1786–1850), steam locomotive mechanical engineer
Tony Hackworth (born 1980), English footballer
Travis Hackworth, American politician

See also
Hackworth valve gear, locomotive valve gear